Stenoptilia madyana is a moth of the family Pterophoridae. It is found in Pakistan.

The wingspan is about 19 mm.

References

Moths described in 1999
madyana
Moths of Asia